State Highway 47 (SH 47) is a State Highway in Kerala, India that starts in Attingal and ends in Nedumangadu. The highway is 18.5  km long. It  is  a major highway in  thiruvananthapuram 
district  that interconnect two important towns   Attingal  and  Nedumangad,  And also the  Road is the only way to connect the  SH 1
|Main-Central Road and 
National Highway 66  from the north - eastern hilly areas of Nedumangad.

The Route Map 
Attingal (starts from km of NH 66) - Valakkad - Venjaramoodu (joins SH 1 - MC road ) - Vembayam - Pazhakutty junction ( joints with SH 02 ) Nedumangadu

See also 
Roads in Kerala
List of State Highways in Kerala

References 

State Highways in Kerala
Roads in Thiruvananthapuram district